Louis Ernest Meinertzhagen (18 September 1887 – 9 November 1941) was a British philatelist who signed the Roll of Distinguished Philatelists in 1932. Meinertzhagen was an expert on the early stamps of France.

References

Signatories to the Roll of Distinguished Philatelists
1887 births
1941 deaths
British philatelists
Philately of France